Gazeta do Povo (GP) is a Brazilian newspaper based in Curitiba, in the Brazilian state of Paraná. The newspaper is almost exclusively published in digital format, with a weekly magazine edition on Saturdays. It is currently considered the largest newspaper in Paraná and the oldest newspaper in the state.

After a sharp turn in its political stance, beginning in 2015, the newspaper became an outlet for Bolsonarismo and Brazilian conservatism.

History
It was founded on February 3, 1919, by Benjamin Lins and Oscar Joseph de Plácido e Silva. In 1962, the newspaper was bought by the partners Francisco Cunha Pereira Filho and Edmundo Lemanski, transforming the newspaper into one of the main companies of the Grupo Paranaense de Comunicação (GRPCOM).

On December 1, 2015,  the newspaper changed format, from broadsheet to Berliner, with a maximum of 48 pages. On weekends, the newspaper was printed in a single 88-page edition. On 1 June 2017, Gazeta do Povo ceased to be published daily in a physical edition in order to focus on its news website.

References

1919 establishments in Brazil
Newspapers established in 1919
Newspapers published in Brazil
Online newspapers with defunct print editions